Baba Nazar (also Romanized as Bābā Naz̧ar) is a village in Boghrati Rural District, Sardrud District, Razan County, Hamadan Province, Iran. At the 2006 census, its population was 3,301, in 681 families.

References 

Populated places in Razan County